Burn to Shine may refer to:

Burn to Shine (album), an album by Ben Harper
Burn to Shine (DVD series), a live music DVD series created by Brendan Canty